The 2019 Eritrean Premier League was the 2019 season of the Eritrean Premier League, the top-level football championship of Eritrea.

A total of 10 teams played in the Division A, also known as the Eritrea Superdivision Zoba Meakel (central region). The title was won by Red Sea FC. Most games took place at the 6,000-capacity Cicero Stadium.

Standings
Last updated 6 June 2019.

  1.Red Sea FC                28  NB: Red Sea champions
  2.Denden                    20
  3.Al-Tahrir                 19
  4.Asmara Bira               19
  5.Sembel Construction       18
  6.Segen Construction        14
  7.Adulis                    13
  8.Geza-Banda                 4
  9.Paradiso                   3
 10.Akria                      2

Champions

References

Football competitions in Eritrea
Eritrea
Premier League